Dzorashen (also, Krykh ) is a deserted town in the Shirak Province of Armenia.

References 

Populated places in Shirak Province